Trenbolone is an androgen and anabolic steroid (AAS) of the nandrolone group which itself was never marketed. Trenbolone ester prodrugs, including trenbolone acetate (brand names Finajet, Finaplix, others) and trenbolone hexahydrobenzylcarbonate (brand names Parabolan, Hexabolan), are or have been marketed for veterinary and clinical use. Trenbolone acetate is used in veterinary medicine in livestock to increase muscle growth and appetite, while trenbolone hexahydrobenzylcarbonate was formerly used clinically in humans but is now no longer marketed. In addition, although it is not approved for clinical or veterinary use, trenbolone enanthate is sometimes sold on the black market under the nickname Trenabol.

Uses

Veterinary
Trenbolone, as trenbolone acetate, improves muscle mass, feed efficiency, and mineral absorption in cattle.

Side effects
Sometimes human users may experience an event called "tren cough" shortly after or during an injection, where the user experiences a violent and extreme coughing fit, which can last for minutes.

Pharmacology

Pharmacodynamics
Trenbolone has both anabolic and androgenic effects. Once metabolized, trenbolone esters have the effect of increasing ammonium ion uptake by muscles, leading to an increase in the rate of protein synthesis. It may also have the secondary effects of stimulating appetite and decreasing the rate of catabolism, as all anabolic steroids are believed to; however, catabolism likely increases significantly once the steroid is no longer taken. At least one study in rats has shown trenbolone to cause gene expression of the androgen receptor (AR) at least as potent as dihydrotestosterone (DHT). This evidence tends to indicate trenbolone can cause an increase in male secondary sex characteristics without the need to convert to a more potent androgen in the body.

Studies on metabolism are mixed, with some studies showing that it is metabolized by aromatase or 5α-reductase into estrogenic compounds, or into 5α-reduced androgenic compounds, respectively.

Trenbolone has potency five times as high as that of testosterone. Trenbolone also binds with high affinity to the progesterone receptor, Trenbolone binds to the glucocorticoid receptor, as well.

Pharmacokinetics
To prolong its elimination half-life, trenbolone is administered as a prodrug as an ester conjugate such as trenbolone acetate, trenbolone enanthate, or trenbolone hexahydrobenzylcarbonate. Plasma lipases then cleave the ester group in the bloodstream leaving free trenbolone.

Trenbolone and 17-epitrenbolone are both excreted in urine as conjugates that can be hydrolyzed with beta-glucuronidase. This implies that trenbolone leaves the body as beta-glucuronides or sulfates.

Chemistry

Trenbolone, also known as 19-nor-δ9,11-testosterone or as estra-4,9,11-trien-17β-ol-3-one, is a synthetic estrane steroid and a derivative of nandrolone (19-nortestosterone). It is specifically nandrolone with two additional double bonds in the steroid nucleus. Trenbolone esters, which have an ester at the C17β position, include trenbolone acetate, trenbolone enanthate, trenbolone hexahydrobenzylcarbonate, and trenbolone undecanoate.

History
Trenbolone was first synthesized in 1963.

Society and culture

Generic names
It has also been referred to as trienolone or trienbolone or tren.

Legal status
Some bodybuilders and athletes use trenbolone hexahydrobenzylcarbonate and other esters (acetate, enanthate) for their muscle-building and otherwise performance-enhancing effects. Such use is illegal in the United States and several European and Asian countries. The DEA classifies trenbolone and its esters as Schedule III controlled substances under the Controlled Substances Act. Trenbolone is classified as a Schedule 4 drug in Canada and a class C drug with no penalty for personal use or possession in the United Kingdom. Use or possession of steroids without a prescription is a crime in Australia.

Doping in sports

There are known cases of doping in sports with trenbolone esters by professional athletes.

See also 

 Metribolone

References

Further reading 

 
 

Androgens and anabolic steroids
Estranes
Ketones
Progestogens
Secondary alcohols
World Anti-Doping Agency prohibited substances